Drake & Josh is an American teen sitcom created by Dan Schneider for Nickelodeon. The series follows two teenage stepbrothers Drake Parker (Drake Bell) and Josh Nichols (Josh Peck) as they live together despite opposite personalities. The series also stars Nancy Sullivan, Jonathan Goldstein, and Miranda Cosgrove.

After actors Bell and Peck previously appeared in The Amanda Show, Schneider decided to create Drake & Josh with them in starring roles. The series aired from January 11, 2004, to September 16, 2007, totaling 56 episodes and 4 seasons. It also had two TV films: Drake & Josh Go Hollywood (2006) and Merry Christmas, Drake & Josh (2008). The series' opening theme song, "I Found a Way", is written by Drake Bell and Backhouse Mike and performed by Bell.

Plot
The series revolves around two teenage stepbrothers, Drake Parker and Josh Nichols, who live in San Diego, California with Drake's younger biological sister Megan and biological mother Audrey, and Josh's biological father Walter. Drake is cool and popular, having his own band and being a ladies' man, yet can be narcissistic and absent-minded, while Josh is intellectual, clumsy, and awkward; yet very loving and caring. Josh ends up working at a local movie theater called The Premiere in the second season of the show, which ends up being a key set location. The two boys are often involved in comedic escapades and challenges while also handling various teenage problems.

Drake and Josh have shown multiple times throughout the series that they care deeply about each other. Drake has helped Josh throughout the series and Josh has helped Drake too. They both worked at a movie theatre together, but Drake takes the blame for an incident Josh created and gets fired as he could see Josh cared about the job more. Drake has taken advantage of Josh and Josh always tries to teach him life lessons. For instance, Josh previously arranged his former camp counselors to teach Drake the evils of gambling.

Cast

Main
 Drake Bell as Drake Parker: Megan's biological brother, Josh's stepbrother, Audrey's biological son, Walter's stepson
 Josh Peck as Josh Nichols: Drake's and  Megan's stepbrother, Audrey's stepson, Walter's biological son
 Nancy Sullivan as Audrey Parker-Nichols: Josh's stepmother, Drake's and Megan's biological mother
 Jonathan Goldstein as Walter Nichols: Josh's biological father, Drake's and Megan's stepfather
 Miranda Cosgrove as Megan Parker: Drake's biological sister, Josh's stepsister, Audrey's biological daughter, Walter's stepdaughter

Recurring

 Yvette Nicole Brown as Helen Dubois, manager of the Premiere movie theater (portrayed by Frances Callier in season 2, episode 7 "Little Diva")
 Jerry Trainor as "Crazy" Steve, employee at the Premiere
 Allison Scagliotti as Mindy Crenshaw, Josh's girlfriend and ex-science fair rival
 Alec Medlock as Craig Ramirez, Josh's friend
 Scott Halberstadt as Eric Blonowitz, Josh's other friend
 Jake Farrow as Gavin Mitchell, another employee at the Premiere
 Julia Duffy as Mrs. Hayfer, Drake and Josh's teacher at Bellview High School

Episodes

Production
Drake Bell and Josh Peck had previously acted together on The Amanda Show, created by Dan Schneider. Bell and Peck's differing personalities inspired Schneider to create a new show starring them as characters with traits similar to their own. An unaired pilot episode featured Stephen Furst as Walter Nichols, although he was busy with another project when Drake & Josh was picked up as a series, and Jonathan Goldstein was cast in the role instead. A house in Los Angeles' Encino neighborhood was used for exterior shots of the family's home, while interior scenes were shot on a sound stage at the Nickelodeon on Sunset studios in Hollywood. As of January 2005, Tribune Studios in Hollywood was also used as a filming location.

Production was suspended in late December 2005, after Bell's injury in a car crash, prior to which he had filmed three episodes of the fourth season. Filming resumed in March 2006. The following month, Nickelodeon greenlit an additional seven episodes for the fourth season, and Bell and Peck also signed on to direct several episodes. With the extended season, filming was now expected to continue through July 2006. According to Schneider, the show ended due to a collective decision from the creative forces behind the show.

The profession of the family's mother and her name are never revealed on the show, although Schneider had written dialogue into the series finale that would have revealed her name as Audrey and her profession as a catering business. The scene was filmed, but Schneider ultimately chose to remove it during editing. Schneider said, "On the one hand, I thought it was funny to finally reveal it, so casually, in the very last episode – there was something ironic about that. But then I decided that, because fans always seemed to have fun trying to figure it out (what 'Mom's' name and job were), it would be better to 'keep the bit going' for eternity, by never revealing it in any episode."

Release

Broadcast
Drake & Josh aired on Nickelodeon and premiered in the United States on January 11, 2004. The final episode aired on September 16, 2007. After the series ended, reruns aired occasionally on TeenNick until 2022.

Home media

Below is a list of official DVD and VHS releases of Drake & Josh.

Reception
The series premiere was watched by 3.2 million viewers, Nickelodeon's highest-rated series premiere in nearly 10 years. As of 2006, Drake & Josh ranked consistently among the 10 most-watched cable shows of the week, and was the top-rated live-action series among children aged 2 to 11 years old. It averaged three million viewers at the time. It proved to be popular with younger viewers. According to Schneider, Drake & Josh had its highest ratings in its final season.

Awards and nominations

Films
The series received two television films. Drake & Josh Go Hollywood premiered on January 6, 2006. In the film, Drake and Josh are left at home in San Diego after their parents go on a ten-day cruise. The boys are told to take Megan to the airport so she can visit her friend in Denver, but they accidentally send her on a flight to Los Angeles. Drake and Josh go to Hollywood to get Megan back, but end up stopping a multibillion-dollar heist and booking a guest-spot for Drake on TRL. According to TV Guide, it was the highest-rated program on all of cable during its opening week.

Merry Christmas, Drake & Josh premiered on December 5, 2008. Michael Grossman directed the film, and Schneider returned as executive producer. In the film, Drake and Josh try to give a foster family "the best Christmas ever". The premiere of Merry Christmas, Drake & Josh broke the record of most viewers for the premiere of a Nickelodeon film with 9.10 million viewers, a title previously held by iGo to Japan.

Other media

Music

Video games
Two video games based on Drake & Josh have been released on the Game Boy Advance and Nintendo DS. Both of them were published by THQ and released in 2007.

Books
A book series based on Drake & Josh has been published by children's publisher Scholastic since 2006. The books are written by author Laurie McElroy.

A Cine-Manga version titled, "Match Made in Heaven",  was released by TokyoPop in 2006. The book was based on the first two episodes of the first season.

Online videos
Beginning in December 2016, Bell and other cast members released a series of short online videos titled Where's Walter? Bell, Sullivan, and Yvette Nicole Brown reprised their roles for the videos, which involve a search for Walter after he goes missing.

Cancelled revival
In March 2019, Bell announced that he and Peck were working on a Drake & Josh revival that would feature both of them reprising their roles. The proposed project would have featured similar characters and scenarios in a more adult, comedic way. At the time, Bell and Peck were in discussions with several networks about the project. However, in October 2021, it was reported that the revival had been cancelled, as a result of production delays and Bell's guilty plea to charges of attempted child endangerment.

In March 2022, Bell and his wife Janet stated that the reboot show they had pitched would be called Josh & Drake. Ultimately, the idea was shelved due to creative differences. The show's script was said to have been written by Peck. Janet stated, "Josh wrote Drake as a failed musician and Josh wrote himself as a real estate agent. OK, that's fine, but Drake is a musician in real life, so it wouldn't make sense." Bell added, "I just asked him to change a couple things and he couldn't and my wife wouldn't let me do it."

In July 2022, while on press for his memoir "Happy People Are Annoying", Josh Peck revealed on an online interview with the YouTube channel "Life stories By Goalcast", that Drake and his wife Janet's accusations blaming him for the reboot being cancelled were entirely false, and that the real reason why the reboot got cancelled was because of creative differences, and the fact that he felt uncomfortable working with Drake Bell, due to his criminal record. He also revealed that they were never friends in real life, confirming that the two went 8 years without seeing or speaking to each other following the show's conclusion."

In March 2023, Miranda Cosgrove exclusively told E! News all about iCarly season three and teased a possible reunion with Josh Peck and Drake Bell at the 2023 Kids' Choice Awards. "

References

External links

 
 

 
2004 American television series debuts
2007 American television series endings
2000s American high school television series
2000s American teen sitcoms
2000s Nickelodeon original programming
English-language television shows
Fictional duos
Television duos
Television series about brothers
Television series about families
Television series about teenagers
Television series by Schneider's Bakery
Television series created by Dan Schneider
Television shows adapted into video games
Television shows set in San Diego
Television controversies in the United States